This is a list of leaders of South Vietnam, since the establishment of the Autonomous Republic of Cochinchina in 1946, and the division of Vietnam in 1954 until the fall of the Republic of Vietnam in 1975, and the reunification of Vietnam in 1976.

Legends

Heads of state

State of Vietnam (1949–1955) 
Under the State of Vietnam, the position of head of state is known as Chief of the State of Vietnam and was held by Bảo Đại.

First Republic of Vietnam (1955–1963)

President

Vice president

Military junta (1963–1967)

Heads of state 
During the military junta period, the heads of state of South Vietnam did not always hold real power, the heads of military were de facto leaders of the nation. Sometimes the heads of state and heads of military were held by the same person, for example: Duong Van Minh from 2 November 1963 to 30 January 1964 or Nguyen Khanh from 16 August 1964 to 27 August 1964.

Heads of military 
During the military junta period, heads of military held the real power in governing the nation. Sometimes head of state and head of military were held by the same person.

Second Republic of Vietnam (1967–1975)

Presidents

Vice presidents

Provisional Revolutionary Government of the Republic of South Vietnam (1969–1976)

Chairman of the Consultative Council

Heads of government

Symbols

Standards

Document seals

Podium seals

See also
List of presidents of Vietnam
List of heads of state of Vietnam
List of prime ministers of Vietnam
List of heads of government of Vietnam

External links
Rulers – Vietnam
World Statesmen – South Vietnam

 

 
Leaders